Terminal Access Controller Access-Control System (TACACS) refers to a family of related protocols handling remote authentication and related services for network access control through a centralized server. The original TACACS protocol, which dates back to 1984, was used for communicating with an authentication server, common in older UNIX networks including but not limited to the ARPANET, MILNET and BBNNET. It spawned related protocols:
 Extended TACACS (XTACACS) is a proprietary extension to TACACS introduced by Cisco Systems in 1990 without backwards compatibility to the original protocol. TACACS and XTACACS both allow a remote access server to communicate with an authentication server in order to determine if the user has access to the network. 
 TACACS Plus (TACACS+) is a protocol developed by Cisco and released as an open standard beginning in 1993. Although derived from TACACS, TACACS+ is a separate protocol that handles authentication, authorization, and accounting (AAA) services. TACACS+ has largely replaced its predecessors.

History
TACACS was originally developed in 1984 by BBN, later known as BBN Technologies, for administration of ARPANET and MILNET, which ran unclassified network traffic for DARPA at the time and would later evolve into the U.S. Department of Defense's NIPRNet. Originally designed as a means to automate authentication – allowing someone who was already logged into one host in the network to connect to another on the same network without needing to re-authenticate – it was first formally described by BBN's Brian Anderson TAC Access Control System Protocols, BBN Tech Memo CC-0045 with minor TELNET double login avoidance change in December 1984 in IETF RFC 927. Cisco Systems began supporting TACACS in its networking products in the late 1980s, eventually adding several extensions to the protocol. In 1990, Cisco's extensions on top of TACACS became a proprietary protocol called Extended TACACS (XTACACS). Although TACACS and XTACACS are not open standards, Craig Finseth of the University of Minnesota, with Cisco's assistance, published a description of the protocols in 1993 as IETF RFC 1492 for informational purposes.

Technical descriptions

TACACS
TACACS is defined in RFC 8907 (older RFC 1492), and uses (either TCP or UDP) port 49 by default. TACACS allows a client to accept a username and password and send a query to a TACACS authentication server, sometimes called a TACACS daemon. It determines whether to accept or deny the authentication request and sends a response back. The TIP (routing node accepting dial-up line connections, which the user would normally want to log in into) would then allow access or not, based upon the response. In this way, the process of making the decision is "opened up" and the algorithms and data used to make the decision are under the complete control of whoever is running the TACACS daemon.

XTACACS
Extended TACACS (XTACACS) extends the TACACS protocol with additional functionality. It also separates the authentication, authorization, and accounting (AAA) functions out into separate processes, allowing them to be handled by separate servers and technologies.

TACACS+
TACACS+ is a Cisco designed extension to TACACS that encrypts the full content of each packet. Moreover, it provides granular control in the form of command-by-command authorization.

TACACS+ has generally replaced TACACS and XTACACS in more recently built or updated networks. TACACS+ is an entirely new protocol which is not compatible with its predecessors, TACACS and XTACACS. Because TCP is a connection oriented protocol, TACACS+ is able to detect and correct network transmission errors.

Comparison with RADIUS 
TACACS+ uses TCP (while RADIUS operates over UDP).

Because TCP is a connection-oriented protocol, TACACS+ has to implement transmission control. RADIUS, however, is not required to detect and correct transmission errors such as packet loss or timeouts, etc., as it makes use of UDP which is connectionless. RADIUS encrypts only the users' password as it travels from the RADIUS client to RADIUS server. All other information such as the username, authorization, accounting are transmitted in clear text. Therefore, it is vulnerable to different types of attacks. TACACS+ encrypts all the information mentioned above and therefore does not have the vulnerabilities present in the RADIUS protocol.

Implementations 

Client implementations
 Arista EOS, a proprietary implementation
 Cisco IOS, a proprietary implementation
 Fortinet FortiOS, a proprietary implementation
 Juniper Junos OS, a proprietary implementation
 Palo Alto Networks PAN-OS, a proprietary implementation
 Pam_tacplus, a TACACS+ protocol client library and PAM module
Server implementations
 FreeRADIUS TACACS+ module, an open-source implementation available since version 4.0
 Tac_plus by Shrubbery, an open-source implementation for Linux
 Tac_plus-ng by Pro-Bono-Publico, an open-source implementation for Linux
 Tac_plus VM, tac_plus with an added webadmin in a VM (no longer updated)
 Aruba ClearPass Policy Manager, a proprietary implementation 
 Cisco Identity Services Engine, a proprietary implementation
 Portnox TACACS+-as-a-Service, a proprietary implementation as a cloud-hosted service
 Pulse Secure Pulse Policy Secure, a proprietary implementation
 TACACS.net, a proprietary implementation of TACACS+ for Windows

Standards documents 
  – TACACS User Identification Telnet Option
  – An Access Control Protocol, Sometimes Called TACACS
  – The Terminal Access Controller Access-Control System Plus (TACACS+) Protocol
 RFC 9105 – A YANG Data Model for Terminal Access Controller Access-Control System Plus (TACACS+)

See also 
 Diameter
 RADIUS

References

External links
 An Analysis of the TACACS+ Protocol and its Implementations from a security standpoint, by Openwall
 TACACS+ Benefits and Best Practices

Authentication protocols
Computer access control protocols
Cisco protocols
Computer network security